The 2013 Dutch TT was the seventh round of the 2013 MotoGP season. It was held at the TT Circuit Assen in Assen on 29 June 2013.

MotoGP race report

This race was most notable for Valentino Rossi's comeback ride to win the race and Jorge Lorenzo's excellent ride to fifth place after a heavy crash in one of the free practice sessions where he badly injured his left collarbone.

On Thursday, reigning world champion Jorge Lorenzo crashed heavily during free practice in wet conditions and fractured his left collarbone as a result. After surgery he was able to take part in the race on Saturday.

After six rounds, Dani Pedrosa narrowly leads the title hunt with 123 points. Close second is Jorge Lorenzo with 116 and further back is rookie Marc Márquez with 93 points.

On Friday, Cal Crutchlow scored his first ever pole position with a time of 1:34.398. +0.357 seconds behind is Marc Márquez in second and +0.480 seconds behind is Stefan Bradl. The second row of the grid consists out of Valentino Rossi in fourth, Dani Pedrosa in fifth and Bradley Smith in sixth place. Iván Silva replaces Hiroshi Aoyama who is still recovering from a crash in free practice on the Saturday of the Catalan round, losing a part of his finger as a result. Michele Pirro also replaces Ben Spies who is still recovering from chest pains which caused him to miss multiple races since the Americas race.

All riders take off and do their usual warm-up lap before lining up in their respective grid slots. As the lights go out, Pedrosa has the best start and manages to get up into first place entering the Haarbocht (Turn 1). Close behind him is Bradl who managed to jump Márquez and go up into second. Third is the Spaniard as he has to fight off Rossi in fourth. Crutchlow gets a bogged down start and has to settle for fifth position. Behind him is teammate Smith in sixth. At Strubben (Turn 5), Márquez goes up the inside of Bradl and takes second. Further back, Nicky Hayden gets passed by Aleix Espargaró who takes a tighter line at Ossebroeken (Turn 4) for seventh spot. Lorenzo then uses the opportunity to quickly move past the American on the outside of Strubben as well for eighth place on the opening lap. Rossi has a look up the inside of Bradl at De Bult (Turn 9) but isn't able to get past. Before De Bult, Lorenzo has already overtaken Espargaró and is now up into seventh position. At the entrance of the Geert Timmer Bocht (Turn 16), Rossi dives down the inside of Bradl and manages to take third.

On lap two, Lorenzo makes a lunge up the inside of Smith at the end of start/finish straight to pass the Briton for sixth position entering the Haarbocht. Entering Strubben, Crutchlow takes a tight line and goes side-by-side upon exit but managing to take fourth from Bradl. Espargaró also takes a shorter line at the hairpin and overtakes Smith for seventh spot. At the Veenslang (Turn 6), Smith retakes seventh from the Spaniard however. The fighting between Bradl and Crutchlow has allowed Lorenzo to close up to them significantly. At the straight before Stekkenwal (Turn Turn 8), Espargaró has retaken seventh place from Smith again. Lorenzo goes up the inside of Bradl at De Bult, promoting him up to fifth place. Pedrosa's gap back to Márquez is +0.649 in sector three.

Lap three and Rossi sets the fastest lap of the race. Pedrosa's gap back to Márquez is +0.565 seconds at the start/finish straight, increasing to +0.733 seconds in sector one. In sector two, the gap decreases to +0.630 before decreasing again to +0.708 seconds in sector three.

On lap four, the gap Pedrosa has to Márquez has decreased to +0.491 seconds at the start/finish straight. Rossi closes up to second place Márquez as Crutchlow sets the fastest lap. In sector one, the gap increases to +0.698 seconds as Lorenzo also closes up on Crutchlow in fourth. The gap decreases slightly to +0.659 seconds in sector two. At the run up to Duikersloot (Turn 11), Crutchlow goes a bit wide and Lorenzo makes good use of this by taking a shorter line a passing the Briton for fourth position. In sector three, the gap increases again to +0.876 seconds.

Lap five and Rossi dives down the inside of Márquez entering Haarbocht, taking second from him as the fans in the main grandstands cheer him on. Rossi is now opening a gap in pursuit of Pedrosa, Lorenzo doing likewise on Crutchlow to chase down Márquez.

On lap six, Rossi sets the fastest lap of the race. Pedrosa's gap at the start/finish straight was +0.405 seconds, decreasing to +0.339 seconds in sector one, dropping again to +0.288 seconds in sector two. In sector three, the gap diminishes again slightly to +0.227 seconds. At the Geert Timmer Bocht, Rossi goes up the inside of Pedrosa and takes over the lead of the race at the exit.

Lap seven and Rossi now leads the race for the first time. The top six is as follows: Rossi, Pedrosa, Márquez, Lorenzo, Crutchlow and Bradl. Márquez's gap back to Lorenzo is +0.824 seconds at the start/finish straight, decreasing to +0.717 seconds in sector one. It decreases again to +0.688 seconds in sector two and in sector three it drops once more to +0.546 seconds.

On lap eight, Márquez's gap back to Lorenzo increases to +0.754 seconds at the start/finish straight. At the entrance to De Bult, Márquez has a moment trying to stop his bike but doesn't lose any significant time over it.

Lap nine and Pedrosa is still relatively close to Rossi in second as third Márquez now starts to come under pressure from Lorenzo in fourth. Exiting Strubben, Lorenzo has now fully closed up to Márquez and at the short straight before De Bult, he closes up so much that he almost makes a move on his inside at the corner but thinks better of it at the last moment.

On lap ten, Crutchlow's gap back to Bradl is +3.601 seconds and Bradl's gap back to Álvaro Bautista is +3.867 seconds. No overtakes happen at the front.

Lap eleven and Rossi starts to open up a gap to Pedrosa. The front is stable for now.

On lap twelve, Lorenzo is now losing ground to Márquez as Crutchlow is right behind him also.

Lap thirteen - the halfway point of the race - and Márquez is closing the gap to teammate Pedrosa. Rossi is still out in front as Crutchlow is still right behind Lorenzo. At the Geert Timmer Bocht, he tries a move up the inside but isn't able to pass.

On lap fourteen, Rossi's gap back to Pedrosa is +0.372 seconds at the start/finish straight. Crutchlow is still right behind Lorenzo and attempts a move at Strubben but misses the speed to get past as the Spaniard also closes the door on him.

Lap fifteen and Rossi's gap back to Pedrosa is +0.522 seconds at the start/finish straight. In sector one, the gap increased to +0.655 seconds, then decreased to +0.478 seconds in sector two. In sector three, the gap widened again to +0.563 seconds in sector three. At the Geert Timmer Bocht, Crutchlow finally manages to get past by diving down the inside of Lorenzo at the entrance of the chicane, taking fourth as a result.

On lap sixteen, Rossi's gap back to Pedrosa has decreased slightly to +0.534 seconds at the start/finish line. Márquez's gap back to Crutchlow was +1.796 seconds at the start/finish line, decreasing to +1.491 seconds in sector one and increasing to +1.578 in sector two. In sector three, the gap drops again slightly in sector three to +1.451 seconds.

Lap seventeen and Márquez's gap back to Crutchlow has increased to +1.655 seconds at the start/finish straight. No overtakes happened at the front.

On lap eighteen, Márquez closes up to Pedrosa. At the end of the Veenslang, Márquez carries a lot more speed at the new, quick right-hand kink but runs wide entering the Ruskenhoek, allowing Pedrosa to get back at him exiting the turn. At the Geert Timmer Bocht, Márquez makes his move by going up the inside of his teammate and taking second place.

Lap nineteen and Rossi's gap back to Márquez is +1.044 seconds, showing that he has increased it since the pair were fighting. Crutchlow has also been able to close up as a result. In sector one, the gap has widened to +1.246 but has decreased in sector two, now only being +1.073 seconds. The gap increases again to +1.107 seconds in sector three.

On lap twenty, Rossi increases his gap back to Márquez again to +1.149 seconds. Meanwhile, Crutchlow in fourth is also slowly gaining on Pedrosa In sector one, the gap widens to +1.231 seconds. Entering Strubben, Crutchlow dives too deep and goes wide, giving some breathing room to Pedrosa. The gap increases again to +1.326 seconds in sector two, then decreases to +1.252 seconds in sector three.

Lap twenty-one and Rossi's gap back to Márquez has increased to +1.550 seconds. The gap widens again to +1.707 seconds in sector one, decreasing to +1.660 seconds in sector two. In sector three, the gap increases once more to +1.864 seconds as Crutchlow is right behind Pedrosa. At the Hoge Heide (Turn 13), the Briton is right behind Pedrosa and shadows him throughout the Ramshoek (Turn 15), going side-by-side with him and passing for third spot at the entrance of the Geert Timmer Bocht.

On lap twenty-two, Rossi's gap back to Márquez has decreased slightly to +1.825 seconds at the start/finish straight. Crutchlow is slowly opening up a gap to Pedrosa and is hunting down Márquez in second place.

Lap twenty-three and Márquez's gap back to Crutchlow was +0.633 seconds at the start/finish straight, decreasing slightly to +0.585 seconds in sector one. In sector two, the gap increased to +0.664 seconds, only to decrease to +0.381 seconds in sector three.

On lap twenty-four, Márquez's gap back to Crutchlow increased to +0.462 seconds at the start/finish straight. Crutchlow closes up even further but is not yet able to pass Márquez.

Lap twenty-five, the penultimate lap, and Crutchlow is still all over the rear of Márquez. At Strubben, the Spaniard blocks the inside line, preventing Crutchlow from attempting a move.

Rossi crosses the line to start the final lap - lap twenty-six - and Crutchlow has still not been able to pass Márquez. Entering the Haarbocht, Crutchlow makes a mistake and almost runs into Márquez but just manages to avoid him, ending his hopes for a second place. Rossi has no problems throughout the lap, exits the last corner, looks back to see how far back Márquez is and as the near entire grandstand stand on their feet to cheer and congratulate him, he raises his arm and crosses the line to win the race - his first and only of the season and the first since the 2010 Malaysian Grand Prix. Behind him is Márquez is second and Crutchlow in third place. Fourth is Pedrosa and Lorenzo comes home a superb fifth after struggling with a broken left collarbone only 36 hours earlier. Further back is Bradl who finishes in sixth spot.

On the parade lap back to parc-fermé, Rossi waves gleefully at the fans after winning a race in nearly three years. Lorenzo is seen suffering visibly with his left hand as a delighted Rossi shakes hands with Márquez while still on the bike. Rossi then raises his arm in the air multiple times as Lorenzo does so once as well. He then rides off the track to some of his fans that invaded the track as many of the fans in the grandstands wave the fluorescent yellow flags with the number 46 on it in pride. Some of the fans congratulate him as the photographers also surround him to make photo's. He steps off his bike and one of the fans offers him to sit on his shoulders, which he duly accepts. He lifts him up and walks him over to the grandstand here his fanclub sits. Márquez meanwhile calmly waves at the fans, as does Crutchlow. He claps his hands, then instructs the fans to stand up for him, the fans doing so in return. On his to the pit lane, Rossi then gets briefly stopped again by two of his fans before going again.

Crutchlow is the first to arrive at parc-fermé, the Briton removing his gloves as he has already stepped off the bike. Rossi is still riding back, throwing his arm in the air as Márquez also arrives at parc-fermé. As Lorenzo arrives at the pits, he is seen visibly in pain and even cries as he needs help from his team to push the bike back inside. Rossi - still riding back - briefly waves at the crowd, then puts his arm up in the air multiple times. By now, Márquez takes off his helmet as Rossi finally enters the pits, still with his arm up in the air as a salute to his fans. A happy Márquez talks and shakes hands with an equally delighted Crutchlow as Rossi finally arrives at parc-fermé, steps off his bike and immediately goes to celebrate with his team. When he's done, he looks at the camera happily, then kisses his number 46 and hugs one of the Factory Yamaha crewmembers. Lorenzo in his garage is still seen struggling as Rossi celebrates with Uccio and other members of his team. Both Rossi and Márquez then get interviewed by the media, after that Márquez goes and talks with his brother Álex Márquez and the Repsol Honda crewmembers.

All the riders make their way onto the podium, first one being Crutchlow followed by Márquez and a very happy Rossi, the crowd erupting in delight as he steps onto the podium. He symbolically kisses the top step of the podium before stepping onto it. The trophies get handed out: First Arjan Bos, President of the Board of the TT Circuit Assen, hands the constructors trophy out to Jeremy Burgess and Crutchlow. Next up is the second place trophy handed out by Lorenzo Sistino, Iveco brand President, which is handed out to Márquez. He raises the trophy happily up in the air as the crowd applauds him. Then it is Jacques Tichelaar, the King's commissioner of Drenthe, to present to Rossi the winner's trophy. He accepts the trophy, kisses it and then displays it for everyone to see. The crowd cheers and applauds as he does so, then the Italian national anthem plays for him. After it stops, the champagne gets handed out by the podium girls as Crutchlow immediately sprays Rossi, with Rossi cheekily spraying one of the podium girls instead. Márquez sprays Rossi, with 'The Doctor' returning the favour before also spraying it on Crutchlow, then into the crowd before drinking some of it. He toasts with the bottle afterwards with the other two before taking a group photo together.

Rossi's victory, Márquez's second and Crutchlow's third place has shaken up the championship. Pedrosa still leads the title with 136 points but the gap has now been reduced to 9 points as Lorenzo has been able to close up thanks to his ride to fifth and Pedrosa's fourth position. Lorenzo now sits second with 127 points while Márquez closes up to Lorenzo with 113 points.

Classification

MotoGP

Moto2

Moto3

Championship standings after the race (MotoGP)
Below are the standings for the top five riders and constructors after round seven has concluded.

Riders' Championship standings

Constructors' Championship standings

 Note: Only the top five positions are included for both sets of standings.

References

Dutch TT
Dutch
Tourist Trophy
Dutch TT